This is the list of presidents of Aosta Valley since 1946.
Source: Regional Government of Aosta Valley – Governments since 1946

Politics of Aosta Valley
 
Aosta Valley